HMS Braithwaite was a  of the Royal navy during World War II.

Originally destined for the US Navy as a turbo-electric (TE) type , Braithwaite was provisionally given the name USS Straub (this name was reassigned to ) however the delivery was diverted to the Royal Navy before the launch.

Actions
Braithwaite served with both the 3rd and 10th Escort Groups earning battle honours for service in the North Atlantic, English Channel, Normandy 1944, North Foreland and the North Sea.

Forty-eight German sailors were killed, and there were no survivors.

Again there were no survivors, and the entire crew of 47 were killed.

Fate
She was declared "not essential to the defence of the United States" on 8 January 1946. The hull number was struck from the Navy list on 21 January 1946, and then sold to Northern Metals Co. of Philadelphia in June 1946 for scrapping.

References

 The Captain Class Frigates in the Second World War by Donald Collingwood. published by Leo Cooper (1998), .
 The Buckley-Class Destroyer Escorts by Bruce Hampton Franklin, published by Chatham Publishing (1999), .
 German U-Boat Losses During World War II by Axel Niestle, published by United States Naval Inst (1998), .

External links
 Braithwaite – Dictionary of American Naval Fighting Ships
 Uboat.net page for HMS Braithwaite
 Uboat.net page for U-327
 Uboat.net page for U-989
 captainclassfrigates.co.uk

Captain-class frigates
Buckley-class destroyer escorts
World War II frigates of the United Kingdom
Ships built in Hingham, Massachusetts
1943 ships